In linguistics, mutual intelligibility is a relationship between languages or dialects in which speakers of different but related varieties can readily understand each other without prior familiarity or special effort. It is used as an important criterion for distinguishing languages from dialects, although sociolinguistic factors are often also used.

Intelligibility between languages can be asymmetric, with speakers of one understanding more of the other than speakers of the other understanding the first. When it is relatively symmetric, it is characterized as "mutual". It exists in differing degrees among many related or geographically proximate languages of the world, often in the context of a dialect continuum.

Intelligibility

Factors
An individual's achievement of moderate proficiency or understanding in a language (called L2) other than their first language (L1) typically requires considerable time and effort through study and practical application if the two languages are not very closely related. Advanced speakers of a second language typically aim for intelligibility, especially in situations where they work in their second language and the necessity of being understood is high.
However, many groups of languages are partly mutually intelligible, i.e. most speakers of one language find it relatively easy to achieve some degree of understanding in the related language(s). Often the two languages are genetically related, and they are likely to be similar to each other in grammar, vocabulary, pronunciation, or other features.

Intelligibility among languages can vary between individuals or groups within a language population according to their knowledge of various registers and vocabulary in their own language, their exposure to additional related languages, their interest in or familiarity with other cultures, the domain of discussion, psycho-cognitive traits, the mode of language used (written vs. oral), and other factors.

Linguistic distance is the name for the concept of calculating a measurement for how different languages are from one another. The higher the linguistic distance, the lower the mutual intelligibility.

Asymmetric intelligibility
Asymmetric intelligibility refers to two languages that are considered partially mutually intelligible, but where one group of speakers has more difficulty understanding the other language than the other way around. There can be various reasons for this. If, for example, one language is related to another but has simplified its grammar, the speakers of the original language may understand the simplified language, but less vice versa. For example, Dutch speakers tend to find it easier to understand Afrikaans than vice versa as a result of Afrikaans' simplified grammar.

Among sign languages
Sign languages are not universal and are usually not mutually intelligible, although there are also similarities among different sign languages. Sign languages are independent of spoken languages and follow their own paths of development. For example, British Sign Language (BSL) and American Sign Language (ASL) are quite different and mutually unintelligible, even though the hearing people of the United Kingdom and the United States share the same spoken language. The grammars of sign languages do not usually resemble those of spoken languages used in the same geographical area; in fact, in terms of syntax, ASL shares more with spoken Japanese than it does with English.

As a criterion for identifying separate languages

Some linguists use mutual intelligibility as a primary criterion for determining whether two speech varieties represent the same or different languages. In a similar vein, some claim that mutual intelligibility is, ideally at least, the primary criterion separating languages from dialects.

A primary challenge to these positions is that speakers of closely related languages can often communicate with each other effectively if they choose to do so. In the case of transparently cognate languages officially recognized as distinct such as Spanish and Italian, mutual intelligibility is in principle and in practice not binary (simply yes or no), but occurs in varying degrees, subject to numerous variables specific to individual speakers in the context of the communication. 
Classifications may also shift for reasons external to the languages themselves. As an example, in the case of a linear dialect continuum that shades gradually between varieties, where speakers near the center can understand the varieties at both ends with relative ease, but speakers at one end have difficulty understanding the speakers at the other end, the entire chain is often considered a single language. If the central varieties die out and only the varieties at both ends survive, they may then be reclassified as two languages, even though no actual language change has occurred during the time of the loss of the central varieties. In this case, too, however, while mutual intelligibility between speakers of the distant remnant languages may be greatly constrained, it is likely not at the zero level of completely unrelated languages.

In addition, political and social conventions often override considerations of mutual intelligibility in both scientific and non-scientific views. For example, the varieties of Chinese are often considered a single language even though there is usually no mutual intelligibility between geographically separated varieties. Another similar example would be varieties of Arabic, which additionally share a single prestige variety in Modern Standard Arabic. In contrast, there is often significant intelligibility between different Scandinavian languages, but as each of them has its own standard form, they are classified as separate languages.

However, others have suggested that these objections are misguided, as they collapse different concepts of what constitutes a "language".

To deal with the conflict in cases such as Arabic, Chinese and German, the term Dachsprache (a sociolinguistic "umbrella language") is sometimes seen: Chinese and German are languages in the sociolinguistic sense even though speakers of some varieties cannot understand each other without recourse to a standard or prestige form.

Within dialect continua

North Germanic

Northern Germanic languages spoken in Scandinavia form a dialect continuum where two furthermost dialects have almost no mutual intelligibility. As such, spoken Danish and Swedish normally have low mutual intelligibility, but Swedes in the Öresund region (including Malmö and Helsingborg), across a strait from the Danish capital Copenhagen, understand Danish somewhat better, largely due to the proximity of the region to Danish-speaking areas. While Norway was under Danish rule, the Bokmål written standard of Norwegian developed from Dano-Norwegian, a koiné language that evolved among the urban elite in Norwegian cities during the later years of the union. Additionally, Norwegian assimilated a considerable amount of Danish vocabulary as well as traditional Danish expressions.  As a consequence, spoken mutual intelligibility is not reciprocal.

Romance
Because of the difficulty of imposing boundaries on a continuum, various counts of the Romance languages are given; in The Linguasphere register of the world’s languages and speech communities David Dalby lists 23 based on mutual intelligibility:
 Iberian Romance: Portuguese, Galician, Mirandese, Astur-Leonese, Castilian, Aragonese;
 Occitano-Romance: Catalan, Occitan;
 Gallo-Romance: Langues d'oïl (including French), Franco-Provençal;
 Rhaeto-Romance: Romansh, Ladin, Friulian;
 Gallo-Italic: Piedmontese, Ligurian, Lombard, Emilian-Romagnol, Venetian;
 Italo-Dalmatian: Corsican, Italian, Neapolitan, Sicilian, Istriot, Dalmatian (extinct);
 Sardinian;
 Eastern Romance: Daco-Romanian, Istro-Romanian, Aromanian, Megleno-Romanian.

South Slavic

Serbo-Croatian dialects in relation to Slovene, Macedonian, and Bulgarian: The non-standard vernacular dialects of Serbo-Croatian (i.e. non-Shtokavian dialects: Kajkavian, Chakavian and Torlakian) diverge more significantly from all four normative varieties. Their mutual intelligibility varies greatly, between the dialects themselves, with Shtokavian, and with other languages.
 Kajkavian has higher mutual intelligibility with Slovene than with the national varieties of Shtokavian
 Chakavian has a low mutual intelligibility with either, in part due to its large number of loanwords from Venetian. 
 Torlakian (considered a subdialect of Serbian Old Shtokavian by some) has significant mutual intelligibility with Macedonian and Bulgarian. 
All South Slavic languages in effect form a large dialect continuum of gradually mutually intelligible varieties depending on distance between the areas where they are spoken.

List of mutually intelligible languages

Written and spoken forms

 Azerbaijani: Crimean Tatar, Gagauz, Turkish and Urum (partially and asymmetrically)
 Belarusian: Russian and Ukrainian (both partially)
 Bulgarian: Macedonian (significantly)
 Crimean Tatar: Azerbaijani, Gagauz, Turkish and Urum (partially and asymmetrically)
 Czech: Slovak (significantly), Polish (partially)
 Danish: Norwegian and Swedish (both partially and asymmetrically)
 Dutch: Afrikaans (in written form; in spoken form partially), and West Frisian (partially)
 English: Scots (partially)
 Estonian: Finnish (partially)
 Finnish: Estonian (partially), Karelian (significantly)
 Gagauz: Azerbaijani, Crimean Tatar, Turkish and Urum (partially and asymmetrically)
 Hiligaynon: Capiznon (significantly) and Cebuano (significantly)
 Irish: Scottish Gaelic (partially)
 Italian: Corsican (significantly), Spanish, Portuguese and Catalan (partially)
 Limburgish: Dutch and Afrikaans (partially)
 Macedonian: Bulgarian (significantly), Serbo-Croatian (partially and asymmetrically)
 Manchu: Xibe
Marathi: Konkani (significantly)
 Norwegian: Danish and Swedish (both partially and asymmetrically)
 Polish: Slovak (reasonably), Czech (partially)
 Portuguese: Galician (very high), Italian (partially)
 Romanian: Aromanian, Megleno-Romanian and Istro-Romanian (significantly) 
 Russian: Belarusian and Ukrainian (both partially)
 Serbo-Croatian: Slovene (partially and asymmetrically), Macedonian (partially and asymmetrically)
 Slovak: Czech (significantly), Polish (reasonably)
 Slovene: Serbo-Croatian (partially and asymmetrically)
 Spanish: Portuguese (significantly in written form; asymmetrically in spoken form), Italian (partially)
 Swedish: Danish and Norwegian (both partially and asymmetrically)
 Tunisian Arabic: Maltese (significantly), Algerian Arabic and Libyan Arabic (both partially)
 Turkish: Azerbaijani, Crimean Tatar, Gagauz and Urum (partially and asymmetrically)
 Ukrainian: Belarusian and Russian (partially)
 Urum: Azerbaijani, Crimean Tatar, Gagauz and Turkish (partially and asymmetrically)
 Uyghur: Uzbek (formerly known as Eastern and Western dialects of Turki) 
 Uzbek: Uyghur (formerly known as Western and Eastern dialects of Turki) 
 Xibe: Manchu
 Zulu: Northern Ndebele (partially), Xhosa (partially), and Swazi (partially; the first three are often considered to be dialects of a uniform Zunda language)

Spoken forms mainly
 Akha, Honi, Hani (variety of different written scripts)
 Bengali: Assamese as well as Odia. Please refer to the respective pages for more information.
Dungan: Mandarin, especially with Central Plains Mandarin (partially; Dungan is usually written in Cyrillic and Mandarin usually in Chinese characters)
Esan: Edo (the different varieties of Edoid languages are mutually intelligible, such that successful communication between speakers is not affected).
German: Yiddish (because German is usually written in Latin script and Yiddish usually in the Hebrew alphabet).  However, Yiddish's use of many borrowed words, chiefly from Hebrew and Slavic languages, makes it more difficult for a German speaker to understand spoken Yiddish than the reverse.
Hindi: Urdu. See the article on Hindustani language. 
 Chittagonian: Rohingya (The Chittagonian and Rohingya languages have a high degree of mutual intelligibility, while Chittagonian is written with Eastern Nagri script and Rohingya is written with Hanifi script) 
Maltese: Tunisian Arabic (partially; Maltese is written with the Latin script while Tunisian Arabic is written with the Arabic script)
 Spanish: Judeo-Spanish (because Spanish is usually written in Latin script and Judeo-Spanish usually in the Hebrew alphabet). Depending on dialect and the number of non-Spanish loanwords used.
Polish: Ukrainian and Belarusian (both partially; moreover, Belarusian and Ukrainian are written in Cyrillic, while Polish is written in Latin) 
 Thai: Southern Thai, Lao (Isan), Northern Thai, Shan and Tai Lue (both partially and asymmetrically; only Central Thai and Southern Thai are significantly mutually intelligible both in written and spoken forms, while other languages have their own scripts.)
 Uzbek: Uyghur (Uzbek uses a Latin alphabet whereas Uyghur uses an alphabet based on the Arabic script)

Written forms mainly

 French: Italian, Portuguese and Spanish. French in its spoken form is not mutually intelligible with Spanish, Portuguese, or Italian due to the great phonological changes that it underwent, but it has partial intelligibility with all three in written form because it preserves its writing from Middle French with very few changes. According to phonological studies, French is the Romance language that has distanced itself the most from Latin. Also, the incorporation of some Germanic words in the base lexicon makes it more difficult for speakers of other Romance languages to understand. According to Ethnologue, French has 89% lexical similarity with Italian and 75% with Portuguese and Spanish (both of which have incorporated some Arabic, Amerindian and African vocabulary).
 German: Dutch. Standard Dutch and Standard German show a limited degree of mutual intelligibility when written. One study concerning written language concluded that Dutch speakers could translate 50.2% of the provided German words correctly, while the German test subjects were able to translate 41.9% of the Dutch equivalents correctly. Another study showed that while Dutch speakers could correctly translate 71% of German cognates, they could only translate 26.6% of non-cognates correctly, suggesting a widely fluctuating intelligibility. In terms of orthography, 22% of the vocabulary of Dutch and German is identical or near identical. The Levenshtein distance between written Dutch and German is 50.4% as opposed to 61.7% between English and Dutch. The spoken languages are much more difficult to understand for both. Studies show Dutch speakers have slightly less difficulty in understanding German speakers than vice versa. It remains unclear whether this asymmetry has to do with prior knowledge of the language (Dutch people are more exposed to German than vice versa), better knowledge of another related language (English) or any other non-linguistic reasons.
 Icelandic: Faroese.

List of languages sometimes considered varieties
Below is an incomplete list of fully and partially mutually intelligible languages, that are so similar that they are sometimes considered not to be separate, but merely varieties of the same language. 

 Karakalpak: Kazakh and Nogai 
 Many Turkic languages are mutually intelligible to a higher or lower degree, but thorough empirical research is needed to establish the exact levels and patterns of mutual intelligibility between the languages of this linguistic family. The British Academy funded research project dedicated to examining mutual intelligibility between Karakalpak, Kazakh and Uzbek languages is currently under way at the University of Surrey.
 Kazakh: Karakalpak, Nogai, Altay and Kyrgyz
 Kinyarwanda: Kirundi
 Kirundi: Kinyarwanda
 Kyrgyz: Kazakh and Altay and Karakalpak
  Samoan: Tokelauan and Tuvaluan (partially)
 Tokelauan: Tuvaluan and  Samoan (partially)
 Tuvaluan: Tokelauan and  Samoan (partially)

List of dialects or varieties sometimes considered separate languages

 Akan: Twi and Fante.
 Northeastern Neo-Aramaic (NENA) is a dialect continuum, with some dialects being mutually intelligible and others not. While Zakho Jewish Neo-Aramaic and Zakho Christian Neo-Aramaic are mutually intelligible, especially on the eastern edge (in Iran), Jewish and Christian NENA varieties spoken in the same town are not mutually intelligible.
 Catalan: Valencian – the standard forms are structurally the same language and share the vast majority of their vocabulary, and hence highly mutually intelligible. They are considered separate languages only for political reasons.
 Hindustani: Hindi and Urdu – the standard forms are separate registers of structurally the same language (called Hindustani or Hindi-Urdu), with Hindi written in Devanagari and Urdu mainly in a Perso-Arabic script, and with Hindi drawing its literary and formal vocabulary mainly from Sanskrit and Urdu drawing it mainly from Persian and Arabic.
 Malay: Indonesian (the standard regulated by Indonesia), Brunei and Malaysian (the standard used in Malaysia, Brunei and Singapore). Both varieties are based on the same material basis and hence are generally mutually intelligible, despite the numerous lexical differences. Certain linguistic sources also treat the two standards on equal standing as varieties of the same Malay language. Malaysians tend to assert that Malaysian and Indonesian are merely different normative varieties of the same language, while Indonesians tend to treat them as separate, albeit closely related, languages. However, vernacular or less formal varieties spoken between these two countries share limited intelligibility, evidenced by Malaysians having difficulties understanding Indonesian sinetron (soap opera) aired on their TV stations, and vice versa.
 Persian: Dari and Tajik — Persian and Dari are written in Perso-Arabic script, while Tajik is written in Cyrillic script.
 Serbo-Croatian: Bosnian, Croatian, Montenegrin, and Serbian – the national varieties are structurally the same language, all constituting normative varieties of the Shtokavian dialect, and hence mutually intelligible, spoken and written (if the Latin alphabet is used). For political reasons, they are sometimes considered distinct languages. Shtokavian has its own set of subdialects, leading some linguists to consider the other dialects (Kajkavian, Chakavian, and Torlakian) as separate languages, closely related to Shtokavian Serbo-Croatian (rather than being Serbo-Croatian dialects).
 Romanian: Moldovan – the standard forms are structurally the same language, and hence mutually intelligible. They are considered separate languages only for political reasons. Moldovan does, however, have more foreign loanwords from Russian and Ukrainian due to historical East Slavic influence on the region but not to the extent where those would affect mutual intelligibility.
 Tagalog: Filipino – the national language of the Philippines, Filipino, is based almost entirely on the Luzon dialects of Tagalog.

See also

 Sister language
 Dialect levelling
 Koiné language
 Lexical similarity
 Lingua franca
 Multilingualism
 Non-convergent discourse

References

Further reading

External links
 Harold Schiffman, "Linguists' Definition: mutual intelligibility". University of Pennsylvania.
 Common words between languages

Language varieties and styles
Comparative linguistics
Dialectology